Randy B. Crites (born 1962) is a vice admiral in the United States Navy, serving as Deputy Chief of Naval Operations for Integration of Capabilities and Resources (OPNAV N8) since May 15, 2020. He previously served as the Deputy Assistant Secretary of the Navy for Budget, and as director of the Fiscal Management Division (OPNAV N82) in Washington, D.C., until he was promoted to the rank of vice admiral in 2020.

Early life and education
Crites was born and raised in Lima, Ohio. He attended Shawnee High School, graduating in 1980. Crites studied mining engineering at the Ohio State University, where he obtained his Bachelor of Science degree in 1984. Crites was commissioned  as an Ensign in the United States Navy in 1985 through the Nuclear Propulsion Officer Candidate (NUPOC) program. In 1996, he moved to Newport, Rhode Island, where he attended the Naval War College and studied security studies and did master's degree in National Security Affairs. Crites is also a graduate of the MIT Seminar XXI National Securities study program.

Naval career
After commissioning through Officer Candidate School, Crites completed training at Nuclear Power School and the Nuclear Power Training Unit before serving as a division officer aboard the Sturgeon-class nuclear attack submarine . He later served aboard the Sturgeon-class  as the Navigator and Operations Officer before his third sea-tour where he served as the Executive Officer aboard the Ohio-class ballistic missile submarine . Afterwards, he assumed command of the Ohio-class ballistic missile submarine , completing four strategic patrols, and later assumed command of the Ohio-class guided missile submarine . 

Crites headed navy's branches stationed at various places. He was appointed as the branch head for Program Planning and Development. His other tours ashore include instructor at the United States Fleet Forces Command (formerly  U.S. Atlantic Fleet), and a naval member of the Tactical Readiness Evaluation Team. He retained prominent positions in the US Navy such as commander of a nuclear-powered submarine project the Submarine Program Section (SPS) and Shipbuilding Account Manager (SAM). As on active commissioned duty, he headed the United States Strategic Command as weapons system programmer. He remained commanding officer of the Performance Monitoring Team (PMT) at Submarine Squadron 4, raised by the US Navy in 1930. 

Before being appointed as Deputy Chief of Naval Operations (DCNO) for Integration of Capabilities and Resources (OPNAV N8), Crites served as commander of Submarine Group 10, director of Maritime Headquarters in the Pacific Fleet, the Director of the OPNAV Assessments Division (OPNAV N81), and most recently served simultaneously as deputy assistant Secretary of the Navy for Budget (FMB) and as the Director of OPNAV's Fiscal Management Division (OPNAV N82).

Awards and decorations

References

External links

 Randy B. Crites at U.S. Department of Defense

Date of birth missing (living people)
1962 births
Living people
Missing middle or first names
People from Lima, Ohio
Ohio State University College of Engineering alumni
Naval War College alumni
20th-century American naval officers
United States submarine commanders
Recipients of the Legion of Merit
United States Navy vice admirals